Noon Hill is a  open space preserve located in Medfield, Massachusetts and centered on  Noon Hill, a prominent summit and scenic vista. It is managed by the land conservation non-profit organization The Trustees of Reservations and offers  of trails available for hiking, horseback riding, mountain biking, and cross country skiing. Oak-hickory forest, wetlands, vernal pools, steep ravines, boulders, and rocky ledges characterize the preserve. Noon Hill is a link in the  Bay Circuit Trail. Holt Pond, a constructed mill pond, is located on the property.

Noon Hill is part of a larger area of protected open space including land owned by the town of Medfield and The Trustees of Reservations' Shattuck Reservation located to the northwest of Noon Hill along the Charles River.

History

The rugged, rocky terrain of Noon Hill was formed via glacial action during the last ice age through glacial plucking and scouring. Holt Pond, the dammed flow of Sawmill Brook, was constructed circa 1764 to service colonial era mills. Other parts of the property were used as pasture land.

Noon Hill was acquired in 1959 as a gift of W. K. Gilmore & Sons; additional land was given by other donors in 1960, 1963, and 1978.

Recreation
A network of trails span the property and connect with the abutting Shattuck Reservation and town conservation land. Most notable is the Bay Circuit Trail, a long-distance hiking trail that forms a  arc around the suburban belt to the west of Boston. Within the Noon Hill reservation, the Bay Circuit Trail passes over the summit of Noon Hill, where open ledges offer views of the landscape of neighboring Walpole, Norfolk, and Great Blue Hill.

The property trailhead is located on Noon Hill Road in Medfield.

References

External links
Noon Hill The Trustees of Reservations
Shattuck Reservation The Trustees of Reservations
Map of Noon Hill and Shattuck Reservation
Bay Circuit Trail
Bay Circuit Trail Map 9
Bay Circuit Trail description of Section 9

The Trustees of Reservations
Protected areas of Norfolk County, Massachusetts
Bay Circuit Trail
Open space reserves of Massachusetts
Landforms of Norfolk County, Massachusetts
Hills of Massachusetts
Protected areas established in 1959
1959 establishments in Massachusetts